Puissance is the high-jump competition in the equestrian sport of show jumping.

Description
The competition involves a maximum of five rounds - opening round followed by four jump-offs, not against the clock. For the jump-offs, in which the fences are raised for each round, there are only two obstacles—a spread fence and the wall—although an optional practice fence is included. In the event of equality after the fifth round, riders share first prize.

The current indoor record for puissance is held by German rider Franke Sloothaak, who in June 1991 jumped  in Chaudfontaine, Belgium on Optiebeurs Golo, breaking his previous record set on Leonardo.

The puissance is similar to, but not the same as, the equestrian high jump competition, which consists of a single, slightly sloping fence made from a hedge topped with timber rails.

Puissance, (from French puissance), is also a word meaning "power". The event has been contested once at the Olympic Games, in 1900.

See also
 Show jumping

References

External links

 Video of Ben Maher jumping 7'3"
 High Jump and Long Jump Records

Show jumping

de:Springprüfung#Mächtigkeitsspringen